Marlborough White Horse, also called the Preshute White Horse, is a hill figure on Granham Hill, a fairly shallow slope of the downland above the hamlet of Preshute, southwest of Marlborough in the county of Wiltshire, England. Dating from 1804, it is one of several such white horses to be seen around Great Britain, and one of nine in Wiltshire.

Many distant views of the horse are obstructed by trees, but it can be seen from parts of the town of Marlborough. One good view is from a footpath running from Preshute House to the A345 road. The figure is some 500 metres south of Marlborough College, within 100 metres of the southeast corner of the college sportsground.

History
The smallest such horse in Wiltshire, the Marlborough horse was cut in 1804 by boys at Mr Greasley's Academy, also called the High Street Academy, a school in Marlborough High Street which occupied the building now The Ivy House Hotel. This was not the present-day Marlborough College, which is only a short distance away. The horse was designed and marked out on the hill by a boy called William Canning, whose family owned the Manor House at Ogbourne St George. From then onwards, it was "scoured", or cleaned up, every year, this becoming a tradition at the school marked by revelry.

Greasley died about 1830, and the school was closed, leading to the horse being neglected for some years, but by 1860 it was back in good condition and can be seen in a photograph taken that year at a cricket match. In 1873 a Captain Reed, an old boy of Greasley's Academy who had taken part in the horse's creation, saw to a new scouring.

The horse is 62 feet long by 47 high, and it has got thinner since the early twentieth century. It was restored again in September 2001, when it was re-chalked with pure chalk mixed with water and applied with a stiff brush, but by the late summer of 2002 it already had grass growing on much of its surface.

A verse of the Marlborough College school song refers to the horse:

For a while in 1969, the horse was not the only hill figure in Marlborough, as the Scout logo was cut into a nearby hill, commemorating the Marlborough Group's Diamond Jubilee. As no permission was granted for the figure to be permanent, the land's owners replanted plants on it later in the year.

Inspiration
The horse may have been inspired by the nearby Cherhill White Horse, which itself was probably created in imitation of the first such Wiltshire horse, at Westbury, remodelled in the 1770s. It is unclear whether the Westbury horse is ancient, but the Uffington horse, now in Oxfordshire, has been shown to date from the Bronze Age. The earliest evidence of the Westbury horse is in a paper of the Rev. Francis Wise published in 1742, which refers to it.

See also
 Hill figure
 List of hill figures in Wiltshire
 Cherhill White Horse
 Westbury White Horse
 Litlington White Horse

References

Bibliography
 William Plenderleath, On the White Horses of Wiltshire and Its Neighbourhood (Wilts Archaeological Magazine, vol. 14 for the year 1872, pp. 12–30)
Rev. W. C. Plenderleath, White Horses of the West of England (London: Alfred Russell Smith, & Calne: Alfred Heath, 1885; 2nd edition, London, Allen & Storr, 1892)
Morris Marples, White Horses & Other Hill Figures (London: Country Life Ltd, 1949; New York, Charles Scribner's Sons, 1949)
Kate Bergamar, Discovering Hill Figures (London: Shire Publications, 1968, 4th revised edition 1997)

External links
Several photographs of the horse at hows.org.uk
Preshute White Horse at wikimapia.org
Aerial image of Marlborough (or Preshute) white Horse at lastrefuge.co.uk
Photograph of Marlborough White Horse at wiltshirewhitehorses.org.uk
Wiltshire White Horses at wiltshirewhitehorses.org.uk
Horse history at wiltshire-web.co.uk (the Wiltshire Web)

Geography of Wiltshire
History of Wiltshire
Tourist attractions in Wiltshire
White horses (hill figures) in England
Marlborough, Wiltshire